Guy Fawkes River, a perennial stream that is part of the Clarence River catchment, is in the New England and Northern Tablelands districts of New South Wales, Australia.

Course and features
Guy Fawkes River rises below Majors Point, on the northern slopes of the Snowy Range, an eastern spur of the Great Dividing Range, east of the village of Ebor. The river spills over the  columned basalt rock Ebor Falls, and enters a deep valley, joined by four tributaries, including Aberfoyle River, flowing generally northward and eventually forming its confluence with the Sara River to form the Boyd River. The river descends  over its  course; and passes below Round Mountain, the highest peak of the Northern Tablelands.

The river's course generally runs from the south to north along the valley of the Demon Fault Line, within the Guy Fawkes River National Park. Adjoining the national park are the Guy Fawkes River Nature Reserve and Guy Fawkes River State Conservation Area.

The Bicentennial National Trail runs along the western side of Guy Fawkes River on what is a travelling stock route.

The largest of the Grevillea genus, Southern Silky Oak, or Grevillea robusta, is distributed in the Guy Fawkes River area, which is the southern limit of its natural environment.

Name
The river is named after Guy Fawkes Day. Major Edward Parke named the Guy Fawkes River after camping nearby on Guy Fawkes Day, 5 November 1845.

See also

 Rivers of New South Wales

References

External links

 

Rivers of New South Wales
Guy Fawkes
New England (New South Wales)
Northern Tablelands